This is a list of United Nations Security Council Resolutions 1801 to 1900 adopted between 20 February 2008 and 16 December 2009.

See also 
 Lists of United Nations Security Council resolutions
 List of United Nations Security Council Resolutions 1701 to 1800
 List of United Nations Security Council Resolutions 1901 to 2000

External links
 United Nations Security Council Resolutions

1801